The James Street Commons Historic District is a  historic district located in Newark, Essex County, New Jersey, United States. The district was added to the National Register of Historic Places on January 9, 1978, for its significance in architecture, art, community planning and development, education, industry, and social history. There was a small boundary increase on September 22, 1983.

History and description
When first surveyed in 1977 for landmark status, the district had 425 structures. Since then about 170 historic buildings in the district have been demolished, or about 40% of the district's urban fabric. When buildings are demolished, the predominant land use becomes surface parking. Rutgers University, Edison ParkFast, St. Michael's Hospital, and the New Jersey Institute of Technology are the main owners of surface parking lots and structures within the district. In 2020, the actions of NJIT president Joel Bloom with demolition of the nationally landmarked Warren Street School resulted in the historic district being listed among the ten most endangered historic places in New Jersey.

Contributing properties

Washington Park (Newark)
American Insurance Company Building
Newark Public Library
Newark Museum
St. Michael's Hospital
Pro-Cathedral of Saint Patrick

Notable people
Guy Sterling - James Street resident, author, and reporter
Clement Alexander Price - American historian
Jeremiah O'Rourke - Irish-American architect at 45 Burnet Street
Seth Boyden - demolished workshop was in the neighborhood
George Westinghouse - demolished factory was just outside the district
John Cotton Dana - founder of the Newark Public Library and Newark Museum
Peter Ballantine - Scottish-American industrialist
Elvin W. Crane - politician and relative of author Stephen Crane
Edward Weston - chemist and engineer, competitor with Thomas Edison
Louis Bamberger - businessman and philanthropist, property owner in the area

See also
National Register of Historic Places listings in Essex County, New Jersey

References

External links

Geography of Essex County, New Jersey
Geography of Newark, New Jersey
National Register of Historic Places in Newark, New Jersey
Historic districts in Essex County, New Jersey
Historic districts on the National Register of Historic Places in New Jersey
New Jersey Register of Historic Places